Giovanni Lucantoni (Rieti, 18 January 1825 – Paris, 30 May 1902) was an Italian composer active as a music teacher in Paris. He had an opera performed in Milan at the age of 25, but later and in Paris turned to composing salon songs.

Works, editions and recordings

Opera
 Elisa, opera, premiere 20 June 1850, Milan

Songs
 Una Sera di carnevale : album per canto e danza - Éditions Tito di Gio. Ricordi - Milan 1853
 Album di danza per pianoforte - Éditions Tito di G. Ricordi - Milan 1856 -
 Piano reduction of Donizetti's Poliuto Press F. Lucca - Milan
 Une nuit à Venise, duettino sur une poésie de Jules Barbier pour mezzo-soprano ou contralto et baryton- Éditions Choudens fils - Paris
 La Primavera, pour piano et chant soprano, tenor et basse. Éditions Choudens Père et fils. Paris c.1900?

References

Italian composers
Italian male composers
1825 births
1902 deaths
People from Rieti
19th-century Italian musicians
19th-century Italian male musicians